Awsworth is a village and civil parish in the Borough of Broxtowe, Nottinghamshire, England. Its population of 2,577 in the 2001 Census and 2,517 in that of 2011 was estimated at 2,551 in 2019. It lies near the edge of the Greater Nottingham area, between Kimberley, Nottinghamshire and Ilkeston, Derbyshire. It has been rated as a civil parish since 1894.

Church
The Parish Church of St Peter has a remaining chancel from the brick church of 1746. The nave was rebuilt in 1902–1903 by Naylor and Sale of Derby, in a freely adapted Gothic style. A projected north-west tower was never built.

Railways

Awsworth once had a station on the Great Northern (later LNER) line from Nottingham to Derby, crossing the Erewash Valley to Ilkeston over the Bennerley Viaduct. This closed in September 1964. At Awsworth Junction, a short distance to the east, a branch line curved north to Pinxton. This line closed in January 1963.

Near the junction the line crossed a viaduct almost half a mile in length across the Giltbrook valley. This was known variously as Awsworth Viaduct, Giltbrook Viaduct and Kimberley Viaduct, but commonly by locals as the "Forty Bridges", although the exact number of arches and girder spans was 43. This viaduct has been demolished, but the Bennerley Viaduct remains.

See also
Listed buildings in Awsworth

References

Further reading

External links

Awsworth Parish Council
History of Awsworth

Villages in Nottinghamshire
Places in the Borough of Broxtowe
Civil parishes in Nottinghamshire